Scooby-Doo! in Where's My Mummy? is a 2005 American animated adventure film, and the ninth in a series of direct-to-video animated films based on the Scooby-Doo Saturday morning cartoons. The film had a limited theatrical release in the United States on May 13, 2005.  The film was first aired on Cartoon Network in the United States on November 24, 2005. It was released on VHS and DVD in the United States and Canada on December 13, 2005. It was produced by Warner Bros. Animation, though it featured a logo and copyright for Hanna-Barbera Cartoons, Inc. at the end. This is the last Scooby-Doo film to have a VHS release.

Plot 
In the year 41 B.C. Cleopatra is fleeing an attack by the Roman Army after her navy's defeat at the Battle of Actium and the decimation and desertion of her army at the Battle of Alexandria. She goes to her tomb beneath the Sphinx to bury the treasure which is guarded by army of the undead and summon a spell to protect the hidden treasure.

In the present day, Velma is restoring the Sphinx and comes across an ancient necklace. She then goes to show Prince Omar, who is leading the restoration, and they accidentally discover the tomb of Cleopatra. Meanwhile, the gang, who hasn't seen Velma in six months, goes to Egypt to surprise her. However, the Mystery Machine runs out of water in the radiator in the middle of the desert. Scooby-Doo and Shaggy try to find water for the Mystery Machine, and find a lake with a water which turns out to be a mirage. The gang meets an Egyptian named Amahl Ali Akbar and his hawk Horus. Amahl is able to use his camels to tow the Mystery Machine and help the gang get to the Sphinx.

There they meet "Fear Facers" host Rock Rivers whose show was recently canceled because he faked some footage. He tells them he is in Egypt investigating a curse. Scooby picks up a scent on "the old nose radar" and leads the gang to Velma. Velma is surprised to see her friends, but is more overjoyed. Daphne notices something around Velma's neck. Velma then shows the gang the ancient necklace she found. She introduces the gang to Omar and they start to explain the curse. Suddenly, the gang is surrounded by a swarm of dirt bikes and helicopters. Dr. Amelia Von Butch, an archeologist and treasure hunter, steps out of one of the helicopters and proceeds to the tomb. Velma and Omar plead with Von Butch not to enter the tomb by telling her of the curse, which says all who enter will be turned to stone.

They are not successful and Von Butch and her team use explosives to open the tomb, unleashing the curse. Outside a sandstorm begins and the gang, having gone out to investigate, runs back into the tomb to find Omar turned to stone. Despite the curse, Von Butch decides to enter the tomb. Fred decides to solve the mystery, although Velma protests saying it is too dangerous. Ultimately she agrees. Scooby and Shaggy want to guard Omar, but Fred tells them that they should not split up. The gang follows Von Butch, setting off a trap in the process separating Scooby and Shaggy.

Scooby and Shaggy are attacked by the army of the undead. Soon after the rest of the gang, Von Butch and her minions are also attacked. Scooby and Shaggy fall down a hole causing Scooby to lose his collar. Velma slips on the ground and drops her glasses. A mummy gives them back to her and she is attacked. Fred and Daphne hear her screams and run to save her but find Velma turned to stone so they take the journal and the necklace.

Fred and Daphne continue searching for Scooby and Shaggy until they bump into Rock Rivers. Together they search through some of the tomb and discover that the necklace is key to the curse. They meet up with Von Butch and are all attacked by Cleopatra. Cleopatra releases a swarm of locusts but Fred and Daphne escape on one of Von Butch's dirt bikes.

Scooby and Shaggy discover a Lost City where they are mistaken for the returning pharaoh Ascoobis and his lanky manservant Shagankhamen. In the Lost City, Scooby and Shaggy are being honored with a feast. The Lost City's leader, Hotep, who explains the people in the village choose to live like "Pharaohs of old". During the feast Hotep sneaks away into his secret chamber.

In a nearby town, at a bazaar, Fred and Daphne are attacked by a disguised Von Butch and her henchmen Campbell and Natasha. Fred and Daphne are hit by a sleeping powder as Von Butch steals the necklace from them. Later that night, Amahl finds Fred and Daphne wakes them up. He tells them that Horus is looking for Shaggy and Scooby. Horus finds Scooby's collar and leads them to where he found it.

Meanwhile, Hotep attempts to feed Shaggy and Scooby to his Spirit of the Sand. The spirit is revealed to be a robot when it falls into the river. Fred and Daphne arrive with Amahl, who reveals Hotep to be a wanted brilliant civil engineer named Armin Granger, who is illegally damming the Nile River, and he is taken away by authorities. With sad, heavy hearts, Fred and Daphne tell Scooby and Shaggy about what happened to Velma, devastating them. Daphne gives back Scooby's collar until she realizes that Von Butch stole the necklace.

The gang comes up with a plan. Fred, Shaggy and Scooby enter the tomb and discover Rock Rivers, who has been turned to stone. Meanwhile, Von Butch is kidnapped by the mummies. Shaggy and Scooby disguise themselves as mummies to sneak in but are soon discovered. Cleopatra arrives and turns Von Butch's minions to stone. Fred signals and Daphne, dressed as Cleopatra, leads an army composed of the citizens of the Lost City into Cleopatra's tomb. In the chaos Von Butch sneaks into the chamber, stealing the crown of Cleopatra and causing the Nile River to burst through the tomb, un-damming the Nile and flushing out the riches hidden in the tomb, thus restoring the treasure to the people of Egypt, according to Cleopatra's last wish.

The mystery is solved when it is revealed that Cleopatra's mummy was really Velma, who had planned the whole thing along with Prince Omar and his workers in order to scare away treasure hunters; they later brought on Rock Rivers to help them document the interior of the tomb. They had made cement copies of themselves to pass off as victims of "the curse". Von Butch and her team are arrested and taken to prison. Velma apologizes to the gang for not letting them in on her and Omar's plan, but claims that she did it to protect them, feeling that it was too dangerous to include them and that if something had happened to them, she would never forgive herself and she begs for their forgiveness. The gang forgives her. Some time later, the restoration of the Sphinx is finally completed. When Shaggy fires a jumbo-sized firecracker, it hits the Sphinx's nose which once again falls off. Omar states that the Sphinx "looks better this way", and the gang shares a laugh.

Voice cast
 Frank Welker as Scooby-Doo and Fred Jones
 Casey Kasem as Shaggy Rogers
 Mindy Cohn as Velma Dinkley
 Grey DeLisle as Daphne Blake / Natasha
 Christine Baranski as Amelia Von Butch
 Ajay Naidu as Prince Omar Karam
 Ron Perlman as Armin Granger aka Hotep / Ancient One #2
 Jeremy Piven as Rock Rivers
 Wynton Marsalis as Campbell
 Oded Fehr as Amahl Ali Akbar / Ancient One #1
 Virginia Madsen as Cleopatra

References

External links 

 
 

2005 films
2005 animated films
2005 direct-to-video films
2000s American animated films
2000s English-language films
American mystery films
American children's animated adventure films
American children's animated comedy films
Warner Bros. Animation animated films
Warner Bros. direct-to-video animated films
Films set in Egypt
Scooby-Doo direct-to-video animated films
Mummy films
2000s children's animated films
American children's animated mystery films
Films directed by Joe Sichta